The Yangling South railway station is a railway station on the Xi'an–Baoji High-Speed Railway. It is located in Yangling, Shaanxi, China.

Buildings and structures in Shaanxi
Railway stations in Shaanxi
Stations on the Xuzhou–Lanzhou High-Speed Railway